

See also 
 United States House of Representatives elections, 1798
 List of United States representatives from Maryland

1798
Maryland
United States House of Representatives